The Argo JM16 is an IMSA GTP Lights sports prototype race car, designed, developed and built by Argo Racing Cars, in 1984. It competed in the IMSA GT Championship sports car racing series between 1984 and 1993. It, unfortunately, did not win any races, however, it did achieve 11 class victories, and one 3rd-place podium finish. It was powered by three different naturally aspirated engines; a Ford-Cosworth DFV Formula One engine, a Buick V6, and a Mazda 13B Wankel 2-rotor engine.

References

Sports prototypes
Argo Racing Cars
IMSA GTP cars
Group C cars